The 2005 AIHL season was the sixth season of the Australian Ice Hockey League (AIHL). It ran from 16 April 2005 until 28 August 2005, with the Goodall Cup finals following on 3 and 4 September 2005. The Adelaide Avalanche won the V.I.P. Cup after finishing the regular season first in the league standings. The Newcastle North Stars won the Goodall Cup for the second time by defeating the Adelaide Avalanche in the final.

Regular season 
The regular season began on 16 April 2005 and ran through to 28 August 2005 before the top four teams advanced to compete in the Goodall Cup playoff series.

Standings 

Source

Statistics

Scoring leaders 
List shows the ten top skaters sorted by points, then goals. Current as of 4 September 2005

Leading goaltenders 
Only the top five goaltenders, based on save percentage with a minimum 40% of the team's ice time. Current as of 4 September 2005

Goodall Cup playoffs 

The 2005 playoffs was scheduled for 3 September with the Goodall Cup final held on 4 September 2005. Following the end of the regular season the top four teams advanced to the playoff series which was held at the Hunter Ice Skating Stadium in Newcastle, New South Wales. The series was a single game elimination with the two winning semi-finalists advancing to the Goodall Cup final. The Goodall Cup was won by Newcastle North Stars (2nd title) who defeated the Adelaide Avalanche 3–1 in the final. Newcastle's goaltender Matt Ezzy was awarded the grand final game puck post-game by coaching director Rob Barnes for his display in the final and throughout the season despite having a shoulder injury that would require surgery post-season. In a first for the league and ice hockey in Australia, the 2005 Finals was broadcast live on the internet via webcam with live instant text play-by-play provided by Peter Lambert. Over 110,000 hits were registered over the Finals weekend with supports watching from as far away as North America.

All times are UTC+10:00

Semi-finals

Final

References

External links 
 Official AIHL website

AIHL 2005 season
AIHL
Australian Ice Hockey League seasons